Survivor Type is a horror short story by Stephen King, first published in the 1982 horror anthology Terrors, edited by Charles L. Grant, and included in King's 1985 collection Skeleton Crew. Speaking about the story, King says: "As far as short stories are concerned, I like the grisly ones the best. However, the story 'Survivor Type' goes a little bit too far, even for me."

Plot summary
The story opens with the following epigraph:

Survivor Type is written as the diary of a disgraced surgeon, Richard Pine, who, while attempting to smuggle a large amount of heroin aboard a cruise ship, is abruptly interrupted when an explosion occurs deep within the ship and it rapidly sinks. After barely escaping the sinking vessel, while encountering a storm in his empty lifeboat, Pine finds himself marooned on a tiny island in the Pacific with very limited supplies and no food. A self-proclaimed "survivor" type, Pine bitterly whittles away the time by using a logbook and pencil as his diary, detailing his rise and fall in the medical profession and his determination to survive this ordeal, get even with the people that "screwed him over," and return to prosperity.

Over time, the diary entries documenting Pine's day-to-day activities become more and more disjointed and raving, revealing his slow mental decay and eventual insanity caused by starvation, isolation, and drug use. Determined to hold out for rescue, he goes to horrifying lengths to survive. He eats insects, kelp and seagulls. After breaking his ankle while attempting to signal an airplane, he amputates his own foot, then realizes he has to eat it to survive. He continues to amputate his own limbs to use as a food source, ingesting the heroin as a crude anesthetic during these operations. Although he initially keeps track of the dates (the entries begin January 26), his increasing mental instability causes him to lose perception of the exact number of days passed (finally ending his entries with "Febba" and "Fe/40?").  His last few diary entries, barely comprehensible, indicate that Pine has sliced off and eaten both legs, as well as his earlobes, and drools uncontrollably as he ponders which body part to consume next. The diary entries end when he cuts off his left hand to eat it ("lady fingers they taste just like lady fingers").

Development
In the Notes epilogue section the 1985 short fiction collection Skeleton Crew, Stephen King wrote the topic of arriving at the story’s premise: "I got to thinking about cannibalism one day . . . and my muse once more evacuated its magic bowels on my head. I know how gross that sounds, but it's the best metaphor I know." King later elaborates that he was so interested in the idea that it was all he could think about for days. Hesitant to write anything down, King gained the assurance for the story after speaking with his neighbor, Ralph Drews, a retired doctor who confirmed that "a guy could subsist on himself for quite a while - like everything else which is material, the human body is just stored energy." Dr. Drews's further elaborations became the inspiration for the opening epigraph of the story.

King wrote "Survivor Type" in 1977, but he was unable to sell it for years; he stated that "not even men's magazines would consider this one".

Adaptations
 Survivor Type (2011) adapted, storyboarded, and directed by Chris Ethridge as a short film for the Buried Alive film festival.
 Survivor Type (2012) adapted and directed by Maine native, Billy Hanson, starring Gideon Emery.
 Survivor Type (2013) adapted by Jeremy Jantz and directed by Kevin Fisk, starring Julia Angelo and Glenn McCumber.
 Survivor Type (2017) adapted and directed by Chase Pottinger as a short film starring Conlan Pottinger.
 It was adapted into the first segment of A Creepshow Animated Special, starring the voices of Kiefer Sutherland and Fayna Sanchez.

See also
 Stephen King short fiction bibliography

References

Short stories by Stephen King
1982 short stories
Horror short stories
Cannibalism in fiction
Uninhabited islands in fiction
Short stories adapted into films